The 1942 Middle Tennessee State Teachers football team represented the Middle Tennessee State Teachers College—now known as Middle Tennessee State University— as an independent during the 1942 college football season. Led by Elwin W. Midgett in his third season as head coach, Middle Tennessee State Teachers compiled a record of 4–2–1. The team's captains were Emory Davenport, Smith, and Bill Burkett.

Schedule

References

Middle Tennessee State Teachers
Middle Tennessee Blue Raiders football seasons
Middle Tennessee State Teachers Blue Raiders football